Quantitative storytelling (QST) is a systematic approach used to explore the multiplicity of frames potentially legitimate in a scientific study or controversy. QST assumes that in an interconnected society multiple frameworks and worldviews are legitimately upheld by different entities and social actors. QST looks critically on models used in evidence-based policy (EBP. Such models are often reductionist, in the sense discussed by, in that tractability is achieved at the expenses of suppressing relevant available evidence. QST suggests corrective approaches to this practice.

Context
Quantitative storytelling (QST) addresses evidence based policy and can be considered as a reaction to a style of quantification based on cost benefit or risk analysis which—in the opinion of QST proponents—may contain important implicit normative assumptions.

In the logic of QST, a single quantification corresponding to a single view of what the problem is runs the risk of distracting from what could be alternative readings.

The concept that some of the evidence needed for policy is removed from view is discussed by  Ravetz, 1987;  Rayner, 2012). They suggest that ‘uncomfortable knowledge’ is subtracted  from the policy discourse with the objective to ease tractability or to advance a given agenda. The word ‘hypo-cognition’ has been used in the context of these instrumental uses of frames (Lakoff et al., 2008; Lakoff, 2010).

For Rayner, a phenomenon of ‘displacement’ takes place when a model becomes the objective instead of the tool, e.g. when an institution chooses to monitor and manage the outcome of a model rather than what happens in reality. Once exposed, the strategic use of hypo-cognition erodes the trust in the involved actors and institutions.

Approach
QST suggests acknowledging ignorance, as to work out ‘clumsy solutions’ (Rayner, 2012), which may permit negotiation to be had among parties with different normative orientations. Saltelli and Giampietro (2017) suggest that our present approach to evidence-based policy, even in the more nuanced formulation of evidence-informed policy (Gluckman, 2014), is often based on an arbitrary restriction of the definition of the problem, which is then reinforced by an effort of quantification - via models and/or indicators, of the selected frame. QST is also sensitive to power and knowledge asymmetries (Boden and Epstein, 2006; Strassheim and Kettunen, 2014), as interest groups have more scope to capture regulators than the average citizen ad consumer. 

QST encourages an effort in the pre-analytic, pre-quantitative phase of the analysis to map a socially robust (i.e. inclusive of the interest of different stakeholders) universe of possible frames. QST expands on one of the rules sensitivity auditing by asking the question of ‘what to do’ in order to avoid that an issue is framed unilaterally. Obviously, the medicine for a diseased evidence-based policy is not a prejudice- or superstition-based policy, but a more democratic and participatory access to the provision of evidence—even in terms of agenda setting. For this a new institutional setting is needed. The proponents of QST flag the affinity of this approach to others such as NUSAP and Sensitivity auditing. 

QST does not eschew the use quantitative tools altogether. It suggests instead to explore quantitatively multiple narratives, avoiding spurious accuracy and focusing on some salient features of the selected stories. Rather than attempting to amass evidence in support of a given reading or policy, or to optimise it with modelling, QST tries to test whether the a given policy option or framing runs conflicts with existing social or biophysical constraints. These are (Giampietro et al., 2014):

 feasibility (is the policy permissible given the existing resources?)
 viability (is it compatible with existing social arrangements or rules?)
 desirability (will society subscribe to it?).

Applications
A recent application of QST exploring the transition to intermittent electrical energy supply in Germany and Spain is due to Renner and Giampietro. Cabello  et al. use QST to explore a case of water and agricultural governance in the Canary Islands. 

Other applications of approaches which can be referred to QST are to the analyses for the cost of climate change, to the controversy surrounding the OECD-PISA study), to food security,  to the controversy surrounding the use of Golden Rice, a GMO crop, and to the ecological footprint of the Ecological Footprint Network.

References

Scientific modelling
Ecological economics
Industrial ecology
Environmental science